The Saigon Governor's Palace, also known as the Norodom Palace and then renamed Independence Palace, was a government building in Saigon, French Cochinchina, built between 1868 and 1873. 

It contained the residence of the Governor of Cochinchina, administrative offices, reception rooms and ballrooms. The imposing and very expensive neo-Baroque building was intended to impress the people of Saigon with the power and wealth of the French. In 1887 the main seat of government in French Indochina was moved to Hanoi, and soon after the Lieutenant Governor of Cochinchina moved to a new, less pretentious mansion. The building continued to be used for ceremonial purposes, and became the residence of the President of South Vietnam in 1954. It was bombed and badly damaged during an attempted coup in 1962, torn down and replaced by the present Independence Palace.

Construction

In 1865 a competition for a new gubernatorial palace in Saigon was announced.
There were two entries, one of which may perhaps have been Achille-Antoine Hermitte's.
The Governor of Cochinchina, Admiral Pierre-Paul de La Grandière, later made Hermitte head of his architectural department, as recommended by admirals Pierre-Gustave Roze and Gustave Ohier, who had met him in Hong Kong.
Hermitte's priority was to design a new Governor's Mansion since the existing wooden building was in disrepair.
La Grandière laid the cornerstone for this building on 23 March 1868, a block of blue granite from Biên Hòa containing a lead coffer that in turn contained newly-minted gold, silver and copper coins of Napoleon III.

Work on the huge governor's palace began in earnest when Hermitte brought in skilled workmen from Canton and Hong Kong.
The site of the Palais du Gouverneur turned out to be waterlogged and the foundations required constant repair to counteract subsidence throughout the building's life.
Most of the materials were imported from France, adding to the cost.
Completion of construction was celebrated informally on 25 September 1869 with a banquet and a ball for everyone involved in the project.
The final, formal opening of the palace took place in 1873 under Governor Marie Jules Dupré.
Dupré moved into the building that year, and the decorations were completed in 1875.
The total cost was 12 million francs, over a quarter of the budget for public works in Cochinchina.

Structure

The Saigon Governor's Palace was intended to impress the local people with France's power and wealth.
The building was in neo-Baroque style.
The walls were in yellow stucco, on foundations of granite imported from France.
The facade was decorated by carvings in smooth white stone, also imported.
The central pavilion had marble floors, while the other floors were tiled.
The palace was T-shaped, and had two rows of arched windows along the front, looking out on the city.
Offices  and official reception rooms were on the ground floor, with the governor's residential rooms above.
The leg of the T held the reception hall and adjoining ballrooms, surrounded by lush foliage.
As reported by the Courrier de Saigon on 20 December 1868,

In 1869 the Vietnam Press reported,

The park covered .
Eight main roads extended from the road that ran round the park and the palace.
As of 1872 a large cistern was being built to supply  of clean water daily  to the palace.
It was described in 1885 as follows,

Later history

In October 1887 Cochinchina became part of the Indo-Chinese Union, whose governor-general was based in Hanoi. The Governor of Cochinchina became a Lieutenant Governor, and a less pretentious residence was created for him by adapting a nearby trade exhibition hall that was under construction, completed in 1890. For the rest of the French colonial era the palace, also known as Norodom Palace, was used only for ceremonial purposes and by Governors General when they visited Saigon. Subsidence often forced costly repairs to the foundations. The central dome had to be replaced in 1893.

On 7 September 1954 the French handed the palace over to the South Vietnamese government, which renamed it Independence Palace and used it as the presidential palace of Ngô Đình Diệm. Later, Diệm had his brother and sister in law, Ngô Đình Nhu and Madame Nhu, moved into the palace with him.

During a coup attempt on 27 February 1962 two airplanes bombed the building and demolished the left wing. President Diệm then ordered the whole building demolished and the present Independence Palace was built in its place.

Notes

Citations

Sources

Buildings and structures in Ho Chi Minh City
Saigon
Presidential residences
Palaces in Vietnam
Demolished buildings and structures in Vietnam